The Lehman's, Port Royal Covered Bridge is a historic covered bridge located near Port Royal in Turbett Township, Juniata County, Pennsylvania.  It is a Double Burr Arch truss bridge and was built in 1888.  It measures  and has vertical siding, windows at eave level, and a gable roof.  It was damaged during Hurricane Agnes in 1972, and subsequently rebuilt.

It was listed on the National Register of Historic Places in 1979.

References

Covered bridges in Juniata County, Pennsylvania
Bridges completed in 1888
Covered bridges on the National Register of Historic Places in Pennsylvania
Bridges in Juniata County, Pennsylvania
National Register of Historic Places in Juniata County, Pennsylvania
Road bridges on the National Register of Historic Places in Pennsylvania
Wooden bridges in Pennsylvania
Burr Truss bridges in the United States